Thane Houser (27 July 1891 Honey Creek, Indiana –23 November 1967 Columbus, Indiana) was an American racecar driver. He was the father of fellow driver Norm Houser.

Primarily a car builder and mechanic as well as a riding mechanic, Houser served as a relief driver in the 1923 Indianapolis 500 and 1924 Indianapolis 500 races for Wade Morton and Joe Boyer, respectively. He drove a Miller in the 1926 race and finished 13th in the rain-shortened event. In July of that year he made his only other Championship Car start at Rockingham Speedway in New Hampshire and finished 18th after being black-flagged 15 laps in. His attempt to qualify for the 1929 Indianapolis 500 was thwarted by a broken supercharger on his Duesenberg, but he served as relief driver for Jimmy Gleason for eleven laps. Gleason would go on to finish third in the race.

In 1931, Houser had the honor of being the Riding Mechanic for Dave Evans in the Clessie Cummins Diesel #8 at the Indianapolis Motor Speedway (see photo, below). 1931 was the first year for the Diesel at Indianapolis.  The Diesel was the slowest qualifier, but started 17th on the grid of 40 cars.  They completed the race with no pit stops and finished in 13th position.

Indy 500 results

References

1891 births
1967 deaths
Indianapolis 500 drivers
People from Henry County, Indiana
Racing drivers from Indiana